Clint Hendricks (born 26 September 1991) is a South African racing cyclist, who currently rides for South African amateur team Enza. He competed in the men's road race event at the 2018 Commonwealth Games, winning the bronze medal.

Major results

2015
 5th Hibiscus Cycle Classic, KZN Autumn Series
2016
 4th Road race, National Road Championships
2017
 5th Overall Tour of Eritrea
 6th Massawa Circuit
 6th Fenkil Northern Red Sea Challenge
2018
 1st Stage 6 Tour de Singkarak
 3rd  Road race, Commonwealth Games
 3rd Overall Tour de Limpopo
1st  Points classification
 6th 100 Cycle Challenge
2019
 Challenge du Prince
2nd Trophée Princier
3rd Trophée de l'Anniversaire
 5th Overall Tour of Good Hope
 6th 100 Cycle Challenge
 7th Road race, African Games
 9th Overall Tour de Limpopo
1st Stage 4
2021
 9th Road race, African Road Championships

References

External links
 

1991 births
Living people
South African male cyclists
Cyclists at the 2018 Commonwealth Games
Commonwealth Games bronze medallists for South Africa
Commonwealth Games medallists in cycling
Sportspeople from Paarl
Competitors at the 2019 African Games
African Games competitors for South Africa
20th-century South African people
21st-century South African people
Medallists at the 2018 Commonwealth Games